María Dolores Gispert Guart (22 March 1934 – 20 July 2018) was a Spanish voice actress, radio personality and director of dubbing, known for being the Spanish voice of Whoopi Goldberg and Pippi Longstocking.

Biography 
She came from a family of artists on her mother's side: her grandparents, Carlos Guart and Carmen Martínez-Illescas, and her mother Enriqueta Guart Martínez-Illescas were theater actors. With her mother she worked on the work Don Juan Tenorio, in 1972.

She began her radio career as an announcer at "Radio Barcelona". In the mid-1940s she started working on film dubbing.

In the 1970s, she was the voice of Pippi Longstocking. In the 1980s, she doubled Sarah Douglas in the V series, and in the 1990s, she doubled the character of Estelle in the series Friends.

She was famous for lending her voice to a number of Hollywood actresses: Whoopi Goldberg, in fifty-one of her films; Kathy Bates, in five movies; Carole Lombard, Darlene Love, and Joanna Cassidy among others.

She was also director of dubbing in The Color Purple and Schindler's List.

Filmography and animated series

References 

1934 births
2018 deaths
Actresses from Barcelona
People from Catalonia
Spanish voice actresses
Spanish directors
Spanish radio presenters
Spanish women radio presenters
Spanish actresses